The discography of Madina Lake, an American alternative rock band, consists of three studio albums, two extended plays, nine singles, and eight music videos.

Studio albums

Extended plays

Live albums

Singles

Music videos

References

External links
 MadinaLake.com Official website

Discography
Discographies of American artists
Rock music group discographies